WMDI-LP (107.9 FM) is low-power FM radio station owned by the American Institute For Jewish Education.

The AIJE was granted a construction permit in March 2003. The WMDI-LP calls were assigned on May 12, 2003.  The station, serving the Lakewood area, began broadcasting in August 2003.

Its programming consists of Jewish music, classes and information of special interest to the area's Jewish community.

External links
 
 New York Jewish Radio Official Website
 

MDI-LP
Radio stations established in 2003
MDI-LP
Jewish radio stations in the United States
Jewish mass media in the United States
Jewish radio